Pedagadavilli is a village in Uppalaguptam Mandal, Dr. B.R. Ambedkar Konaseema district in the state of Andhra Pradesh in India.

Geography 

Demographics 
 India census, Pedagadavilli had a population of 1511, out of which 760 were male and 751 were female. The population of children below 6 years of age was 10%. The literacy rate of the village was 82%.

References 

Villages in Uppalaguptam mandal